NGC 3414 is a lenticular galaxy in the constellation Leo Minor. It was discovered by William Herschel on April 11, 1785. It is the central galaxy of a rich galaxy group. Two galaxies, NGC 3418 and UGC 5958, have similar redshifts and are within 800,000 light-years (250 kiloparsecs) of NGC 3414. It is a member of the NGC 3504 Group of galaxies, which is a member of the Leo II Groups, a series of galaxies and galaxy clusters strung out from the right edge of the Virgo Supercluster.

It has a peculiar morphology, and is listed in Halton Arp's Atlas of Peculiar Galaxies as Arp 162. The outer disc is nearly face-on, and the inner disk has a higher ellipticity and perhaps a central bar. There is a radio source that is powered by a central active galactic nucleus.

References

External links 
 

Leo Minor
3414
Lenticular galaxies
162
032533